Katoomba Christian Convention (KCC) is an interdenominational ministry providing evangelical Bible preaching to Christians.

At present there are six conventions (many of them run over 2–3 identical weekends).

The site also hosts the annual CMS Summer School, organised by the Church Missionary Society which draws close to 3000 people a day during the first week of January.

Conventions
There are multiple conventions including Onward (High Schoolers, Young Adults and Adults), Oxygen (Christian Leaders), NextGen (Rising Youth and Children's Ministry Leaders),  One Love (Women's Conference), Basecamp (Men's Conference), KYCK (high schoolers) and KEC (all ages).

Onward is a new conference across two days; its purpose is to directly address some of the pressing cultural issues facing Christians today.

Oxygen is an international gathering of Christian leaders for refreshment and encouragement.

NextGen equips youth, children's and potential "rising" ministry leaders for a lifetime of ministry.
One Love is a one-day conference to inspire women through preaching, testimony and fellowship.

Basecamp was a rest stop for men to meet together to hear from God and renew their strength.

KYCK is a three-day convention for high schoolers to grow in their faith together. It runs across 3 days and is repeated over 3 massive weekends with around 2000 teenagers attending  each weekend.

KEC (Katoomba Easter Convention) is a weekend of refreshment for the whole family. Includes children's programs.

It is currently directed by Jonathan Dykes.

List of previous conventions

Previous conventions have included City Youth Convention (CYC), KYC express, October Katoomba Convention (OKC) and Katoomba Convention Plus (KC+). KCC was the organisation behind the sell out event at the Sydney Entertainment Centre—Burn Your Plastic Jesus and has organised Pastor's Convention with Matt Chandler.

In 2011 KCC ran one of the biggest conventions for Christian leaders ever held in Sydney, Oxygen. Leaders were refreshed in their ministry by the preaching of John Piper & John Lennox. Oxygen was followed by One, a sell-out event at the Sydney Entertainment Centre where John Piper and John Lennox preached to nearly 10,000 people.

Conventions

History
The first Katoomba Christian Convention was held in 1903. A history of the ministry was published to coincide with its centenary under the title "A Century Preaching Christ".

List of Convention chairmen
 David Cook
 Phillip Jensen
 Alan Stewart 
 Phil Wheeler (current chairman)

References

External links
 Official homepage

  Convention site on Google Maps
 Braga, Stuart (2003). Book review: A Century Preaching Christ. Katoomba Christian Convention, Limited. .
 Robson, Geoff (2003 November 22). "Book review: A Century Preaching Christ by Stuart Braga", Southern Cross.

Evangelical Christian conferences
Evangelical parachurch organizations